Gábor Domokos (born 12 November 1961) is a Hungarian mathematician and engineer. He is best known for his 2006 discovery of  the Gömböc, a class of three-dimensional (3D) convex bodies that have one stable and one unstable point of balance. Their shape helped to relate the body structure of some tortoises and their ability to recover after being placed upside down.

Career
Domokos spent most of his career at the Budapest University of Technology and Economics (BME), where he received his MSc degree in architecture and engineering in 1986, and defended a PhD in 1989 and habilitation in 1996. He became a full professor at BME in 1996, and in 2002 was appointed as head of Department of Mechanics, Materials and Structures. In 1989–1999 Domokos spent one year teaching at Cornell University where he is adjunct professor of mechanical and aerospace engineering. In 2004 he has been elected as the youngest member of the Hungarian Academy of Sciences – first as a corresponding member and since 2010 as a full member. In 2008-2009 he spent one year as a Visiting Fellow Commoner at Trinity College, Cambridge. In 2015 Domokos gave the Hooke Lecture  at the University of Oxford on the Gömböc and natural shape evolution.

Research
Domokos is mostly known for his work on mono-monostatic bodies, that is, convex bodies that have one stable and one unstable point of balance. In 1995 he met the prominent Russian mathematician Vladimir Arnold, who suggested that 3D mono-monostatic bodies do exist and urged Domokos to find one. Aided by his wife, Domokos developed a classification system for 3D objects based on their points of equilibrium by analyzing pebbles and noting their equilibrium points. In one experiment, the couple tried 2000 pebbles collected at the beaches of the Greek island of Rhodes and found no single mono-monostatic body among them, illustrating the difficulty of the problem. In 2006 Domokos and his student Péter Várkonyi theoretically found a stable class of mono-monostatic solutions, which they named gömböc (a diminutive of  gömb meaning a "sphere" in Hungarian). Since then they manufactured a series of gömböcs for various institutions, museums and exhibitions, such as the World Expo 2010. They also applied their gömböc-inspired shape analysis to the evolution of tortoises, relating their body structure and the ability to recover after being placed upside down. On 13 February 2009, a gömböc appeared on BBC One Friday night show QI, where the host Stephen Fry demonstrated its properties and Domokos, who was present in the audience, explained its history and relation to turtles. In 2015, Domokos and his co-authors expanded their previous shape analysis of terrestrial pebbles to Martian rocks.

Awards
Knight's Cross of the Republic of Hungary (2007).

References

Living people
1961 births
20th-century Hungarian mathematicians
21st-century Hungarian mathematicians